Normal as Blueberry Pie – A Tribute to Doris Day is the fourth studio album by American singer-songwriter, Nellie McKay. Released in 2009 by Verve Records, it is McKay's first cover album, composed of songs previously recorded by American singer and actress Doris Day, except the track "If I Ever Had a Dream", which is an original song written by McKay in tribute to Day.

The album with the bonus track, "I Want To Be Happy", was made available through Barnes & Noble. Additionally, the iTunes edition of the album features a different bonus track, "I'll Never Smile Again".

Track listing

Standard release
 "The Very Thought of You" (Ray Noble)
 "Do Do Do" (George Gershwin, Ira Gershwin)
 "Wonderful Guy" (Oscar Hammerstein II, Richard Rodgers)
 "Meditation" (Norman Gimbel, Antônio Carlos Jobim)
 "Mean to Me" (Fred E. Ahlert, Roy Turk)
 "Crazy Rhythm" (Irving Caesar, Roger Wolfe Kahn, Joseph Meyer)
 "Sentimental Journey" (Les Brown, Bud Green, Ben Homer)
 "If I Ever Had a Dream" (Nellie McKay)
 "Black Hills of Dakota" (Sammy Fain, Paul Francis Webster)
 "Dig It" (Johnny Mercer)
 "Send Me No Flowers" (Burt Bacharach, Hal David)
 "Close Your Eyes" (Bernice Petkere)
 "I Remember You" (Johnny Mercer, Victor Schertzinger)

Barnes and Noble exclusive edition
Standard Track Listing including as Track 14:
 "I Want to Be Happy" (Barnes and Noble Bonus track)

iTunes edition
Standard Track Listing including an album-only Track 14:
 "I'll Never Smile Again" (iTunes Bonus track)

Charts

References

Nellie McKay albums
2009 albums
Verve Records albums
Doris Day tribute albums
Covers albums